WNSY (100.1 FM) is a commercial radio station in northwest Georgia, licensed to Talking Rock.  It is owned by Davis Broadcasting of Atlanta and it simulcasts WJZA on 1310 kHz in Decatur.  The two stations, along with an Atlanta FM translator station at 101.1 MHz, simulcast a smooth jazz radio format.  The stations use the dial position of the translator, calling themselves "101.1 WJZA."

WNSY's transmitter is near Jasper, Georgia, about 50 miles north of metro Atlanta.  Its broadcast range is most of northwest Georgia, but too far from Atlanta to be heard in the city and its close-in suburbs.

History
The station's construction permit was applied for from the Federal Communications Commission in 1995.  It went on the air as WCHK-FM in 1998.  The original WCHK-FM 105.5 is now WBZY 105.7 and owned by iHeartMedia.  The station at 100.1 became oldies  Sunny 100 in 1999.

In January 2007, Davis Broadcasting of Columbus, Georgia, completed the purchase of WNSY and WCHK.  WNSY, Sunny 100 went off the air on the morning of January 22, 2007, and returned on February 1 with the simulcast of WLKQ, carrying Regional Mexican programming.

Listeners to Sunny 100 were surprised by the loss of the station.  For the next 14 months, only two FM stations in Northwest Georgia carried any sort of oldies genre:  WATG "95.7 The Ridge" in Rome and WSRV "97.1 The River" in Atlanta, both under the classic hits format.

The original WCHK-FM
McClure owned the original WCHK-FM, which was located at 105.5 FM and broadcast a locally oriented format that was a mix of country and Southern Gospel music.  It was a simulcast of WCHK AM 1290, the original station of Cherokee Broadcasting, named for Cherokee County, Georgia.  The CHK in turn stands for Cherokee.

In 1991 the station received FCC approval to upgrade to a much stronger signal and move to the 105.7 frequency, allowing it to be heard throughout the metro Atlanta media market.  This moved the station from its allotment on Bear Mountain near Waleska, to the new tower next to Interstate 575 in Holly Springs, Georgia.  (It has since moved to Sweat Mountain, even closer to Atlanta.)

The station remained under local management for a little over a year, briefly as "North Metro's K-105", then with a revamped format as "Atlanta's Classic Country 105.7".  In 1993 the frequency was leased by local marketing agreement (LMA) to Jacor (which would later merge with Clear Channel) and simulcasted WGST AM 640 under the WGST-FM callsign, especially since that station was extremely difficult to receive at night even locally.  In 2000, Clear Channel abandoned the WGST simulcast, and the station became WMXV "Mix 105.7".

In 2003, when then WFOX (now WSRV) FM 97.1 abandoned its oldies format, Clear Channel picked up the format, becoming WLCL "Cool 105.7".  For the next year, Cherokee Broadcasting was the legal owner of the licenses of two oldies stations in the same area, WNSY and WLCL (although Cherokee Broadcasting only operated WNSY).  The 105.7 frequency was sold outright to Clear Channel in 2004, and oldies was abandoned on 105.7 in May 2005.

External links

NSY
Cherokee County, Georgia
Pickens County, Georgia
Radio stations established in 1995
Smooth jazz radio stations in the United States